Emil Marius Knudsen (9 April 1872 – 13 August 1956) a Norwegian psychic. Knudsen was known as a European talented mind-reader of the early 20th century.

Early life
Knudsen was born and raised in Steinkjer, Norway. Reportedly, psychic premonitions befell Emil Knudsen during his early childhood. In 1877, at the age of five, he said he foresaw the burning of the nearby town of Levanger. His ability to "see" continued to develop through his youth, and he became respected as a kind of hero throughout Nord-Trøndelag county.

Career
In 1905, Knudsen moved to Trondheim, where he was hired by a large textile manufacturer to preside over his first official séance. Soon after, he went on tour throughout the world, demonstrating his abilities as a mind-reader. Using his reputed psychic abilities, he supposedly helped solve serious crimes and find missing people and things.

However, Knudsen was most known for his mind-reading capabilities, especially during the times when he traveled abroad. He was able to impress with his ability to read people’s thoughts, and he came to be considered the best psychic in Europe. But Knudsen did not just use his supposed abilities for show; he was very much engaged as a psychic, and many sought out his advice, visiting him privately or sending letters, or using the telephone.

An elderly woman once wrote Knudsen to ask which numbers she should play in the lottery. Knudsen replied, “If I knew that, I would personally buy the number, instead of living as a poor man.”

Just after World War II, at the age of 73, Knudsen was stricken with a weakness that left him bedridden for many years. But he still practiced his claimed psychic abilities from his sickbed. A steady flow of customers came to him, and the mail kept on growing on his table. Time and distance meant nothing to him in terms of his ability to do his work.

The last big triumph that he had was when he was 83 years old. As an adviser at Trondheim’s Tyholt Hospital he claimed to “see” a child who had disappeared in the United States and was being sought by a huge search party, including helicopters. Knudsen contacted the search party, and the child was found where Knudsen “saw” him.

Knudsen’s great-nephew is American artist Jeffrey Vallance.

References

External links
Norwegian
   Emil Knudsen biography at City of Trondheim (Norway) tourist information guide
   Norwegian Spiritual Theory and its Origins
   Norwegian Psychics at NRK Media
   Reference to Accounts and Notes from My Life and My Travel, a book by Emil Knudsen
   Biography at SteinkjerLeksikonet
   History of Norwegian Mediums
   Article at the National Museum of Justice, Norway

1872 births
1956 deaths
People from Steinkjer
Norwegian psychics
Remote viewers